Enakku 20 Unakku 18 is a 2003 Indian romantic comedy film written and directed by Jyothi Krishna. The film stars Tarun, Trisha, and Shriya Saran. It was filmed simultaneously in Tamil and Telugu languages with the latter titled Nee Manasu Naaku Telusu with Sunil and Tanikella Bharani replacing  Vivek and Manivannan respectively. The film's score and soundtrack are composed by A. R. Rahman. This film marks the Telugu debut of Trisha and the Tamil debut of Shriya Saran.

Plot
Sridhar is a final year management degree student and gets selected for post grad studies in United States. He goes to Mumbai for an interview and in his return by train, finds Preeti and loses his heart to her. Sridhar learns that Preeti is about to join in an und
ad degree in the second year and Preeti learns that he is a final year degree student. Sridhar is an ardent cricket fan, so is Preeti, while Sridhar is also a good football player. Unfortunately, both leave without revealing any details. Preeti is moving to town, as her brother Kumar is an IPS officer who has been transferred from Bombay on special deputation. Preeti's family move to the house on the street adjacent to Sridhar's. Sridhar's elder brother-in-law was a Government civil engineer, who has been in prison on false corruption charges, for a collapsed bridge.

The principal of Sridar's college appoints a student-cum-coach called Reshma, for the football team led by Sridhar. Sridhar tries his best to trace Preeti by visiting several women's colleges, while Preeti also watches for Sridhar at the men's college. Accidentally, Preeti helps Sridhar's mother, when she has a heart attack. In order to find Preeti at any cost, Sridhar goes to the LB Stadium, where a cricket match is in progress and gets injuries in a bomb blast in the stadium. Just before the blast, both Preeti and Sridhar find each other but could not meet due to the blast.

Later Preeti's parents convince her to agree for a marriage and tell her to forget about the boy she was searching. At the same time, Sridhar's mother also tells him to concentrate on studies and go abroad to complete his studies. At this juncture, Sridhar learns that Preeti was staying just behind his house, when her parents come to his house to inform that she is getting married. Sridhar's gang participates in an inter-college football match and wins the cup.Sridhar's mother suffers yet another heart attack and Preeti's father admits her in the hospital. Then they come to know that Sridhar's brother-in-law was behind bars for no fault of his. Preeti learns about Sridhar's brother-in-law and asks her brother to help. Kumar and his men raid the godowns of the contractor involved, and find waste quality materials in his stock. This saves Sridhar's brother-in-law and he is released. Meanwhile, Sridhar's mother passes away. Later Sridhar's brother-in-law is posted to another city and he leaves with his wife and son. Sridhar feels lonely so, he decides to emigrate. He departs suddenly without informing his friends.

Three years later, Sridhar and Preeti meet at same train, while Preeti is coming with her new born nephew, Sridhar is going home with his friend Priyanka. Priyanka reveals to Preeti that she is trying to get Sridhar to marry her. Sridhar gets down to fetch water, and misses the train. But he finds Preeti waiting and they reveal their love to one another, and become a couple.

Cast

Tamil
Cell Murugan as Traffic police
Shehnaz as Kapali's friend

Production

Trisha had signed the film before any of her other films had released. For one song,  260 shots were taken and picturised at 90 locations in Chennai and Hyderabad.

Release
The Hindu wrote, "certain scenes have appreciable depth while some are downright superficial and predictable" and that the film was "absorbing in parts, spontaneous in spurts, natural at times and clichéd now and then". Karthiga Rukmanykanthan of the Sri Lankan newspaper Daily News labelled it as "strictly for youth" and a "perfect choice". Idlebrain wrote that "This film is titled as 'Nee Manasu Naaku Telusu'. But contrary to it, the lovers fail to read what is there in the other heart's when they meet each other for second time". The film was also planned to dubbed in Hindi but was cancelled due to unknown reason.

Soundtrack

The soundtrack was composed by A. R. Rahman. Lyrics were written by Pa. Vijay for the Tamil version. The same set of vocalists were used for both versions, except for two songs. Mano and Unnikrishnan were replaced by S. P. B. Charan and Venkat Prabhu in the Tamil version of the song "Snehitude Unte", titled Oru Nanban Irundhal. Sriram Parthasarathy was replaced by Srinivas in the Tamil version of the song "Masthura", titled Asathura.

Tamil Soundtrack
The soundtrack features 6 songs composed by A. R. Rahman.

Telugu Soundtrack

References

External links 
 

2003 films
Indian romantic comedy films
2000s Tamil-language films
2000s Telugu-language films
Films scored by A. R. Rahman
Indian multilingual films
2003 multilingual films
2003 romantic comedy films
2003 directorial debut films
Films directed by Jyothi Krishna (director)